Kálnica is a village and municipality in Nové Mesto nad Váhom District in the Trenčín Region of western Slovakia.

History
In historical records the village was first mentioned in 1396.

Geography
The municipality lies at an elevation of 215 metres (705 ft) and covers an area of 26.404 km² (10.195 mi²). It has a population of about 1,047.

Genealogical resources

The records for genealogical research are available at the state archive "Statny Archiv in Bratislava, Slovakia"

 Roman Catholic church records (births/marriages/deaths): 1676-1934 (parish B)

Notable residents

 Gyula Kertész (1888–1982), Hungarian footballer

See also
 List of municipalities and towns in Slovakia

References

External links

  Official page
Surnames of living people in Kalnica

Villages and municipalities in Nové Mesto nad Váhom District